The Atlas ACE is a South African turboprop trainer, that was designed by the Atlas Aircraft Corporation as a contender to replace the North American Harvard in service with the South African Air Force. The aircraft was not selected and only two examples were completed.

Design and development
The design originated as the 1986 Project Ovid by the government research agency Aerotek, as a composites technology demonstrator. In 1991 the design was entered into a competition to replace the North American Harvard by the Atlas Aircraft Corporation as the ACE (All Composite Evaluator).

The ACE is a tandem two-seat low-wing cantilever monoplane powered by a Pratt & Whitney PT6A turboprop. It has a retractable nosewheel landing gear and a conventional tail unit. The aircraft is constructed from carbon fiber composites.

The prototype was first flown on 29 April 1991, but did not win the competition which was awarded to the Pilatus PC-7.

On 14 January 1995 the prototype was lost in a wheels up landing at Jan Smuts Airport. The second improved aircraft was scheduled to fly, but the design was not developed.

Specifications

See also

References

Notes

Bibliography

1990s South African military trainer aircraft
Single-engined turboprop aircraft